The Peck-Crim-Chesser House is a historic home located at Philippi, Barbour County, West Virginia, US. It was built in 1884, and is a large, two-story red brick house on a limestone foundation.  It features highly pitched multiple gables and tall chimneys with corbeled caps.  The house is a significant local example of Late Victorian architecture, and was for many years associated with descendants and members of the locally prominent Peck and Crim families.

The house was listed on the National Register of Historic Places in 1984.

See also
National Register of Historic Places listings in Barbour County, West Virginia
J.N.B. Crim House

References

Houses completed in 1884
Houses in Barbour County, West Virginia
Houses on the National Register of Historic Places in West Virginia
National Register of Historic Places in Barbour County, West Virginia
Victorian architecture in West Virginia
Individually listed contributing properties to historic districts on the National Register in West Virginia